Lance Joseph Shaw (born 24 August 1983) is a New Zealand cricketer who plays for the Auckland Aces in the State Championship and the Auckland Stars in the NBL, and has recently signed as the marquee player of the New Zealand Breakers in the HUMMER NBL Championship. He was born in Auckland. He is the younger brother of Gareth Shaw.

See also
 List of Auckland representative cricketers

External links
 

1983 births
Living people
New Zealand cricketers
Auckland cricketers